Henry M. Helgerson, Jr. (born January 12, 1952) is an American politician. He has served as a Democratic member for the 83rd district in the Kansas House of Representatives since 2016. He previously served in the House from 1983 to 2001 (86th district) and in the Kansas Senate from 2003 to 2004 (28th district).

References

External links
Vote Smart Henry Helgerson

1952 births
Living people
Democratic Party members of the Kansas House of Representatives
21st-century American politicians
Democratic Party Kansas state senators
Harvard University alumni
Rockhurst University alumni
20th-century American politicians